The Amazing Race 2 is the second season of the American reality television show The Amazing Race. It featured eleven teams of two in a race around the world.

The season premiered on CBS on March 11, 2002, and ended on May 15, 2002.

Lifelong friends Chris Luca and Alex Boylan were the winners of this season, while estranged couple Wil Steger and Tara Lynch finished in second place, and siblings Blake Mycoskie and Paige Mycoskie finished in third.

Production

Development and filming

The second season of The Amazing Race traveled 52,000 miles in 28 days, spanning five continents and eight countries. Location scouting took place during September 2001 but was paused for a month and a half following the September 11 attacks. Filming was originally scheduled to take place in November and December 2001, but was postponed to January and February 2002. The Amazing Race 2 featured first time visits to Brazil, Namibia, Australia, New Zealand, and Hong Kong, and was the first season to travel to the continents of South America and Oceania. During pre-production, producers had planned a leg in Argentina, but cancelled it due to Argentina’s political instability when its economy failed. Argentina was eventually visited in The Amazing Race 5.

The edition marked the debut of several show traditions. The color scheme for all route markers and flags was changed to yellow and red after the previous season's yellow and white. In addition, host Phil Keoghan and a local greeter welcomed all teams arriving at the pit stops at the end of each leg. Previously, Keoghan had appeared only to greet the last-place teams.

Contestant Cyndi Kalenberg claimed that there was confusion about the vehicle replacement rules in Leg 2, in which the racers were informed that if their designated jeep broke down, the racers themselves would have to pay for repairs and wait for it to be fixed. Blake & Paige, however, were provided with a new vehicle when their jeep broke down, helping them to beat Hope & Norm in a race for second-to-last place to the pit stop. This enabled Blake & Paige to stay in the competition, while Hope & Norm were eliminated. For the next season, the show's policy was changed so that a team would receive a replacement if a production-provided vehicle broke down or became unsafe to drive through no fault of the team, but that teams would not be given any time credit in the event of a breakdown.

Casting
Casting for the second season began during the summer of 2001 before the first season premiered. Casting finals took place in Los Angeles in September during the September 11 attacks.

Marketing
This season had two official sponsors: American Airlines and Royal Caribbean International. These two sponsors provided the prizes that were sometimes awarded to first place teams.

Cast
 

Eleven teams participated in the second season of The Amazing Race. The cast featured twins, a mother/daughter duo, siblings, grandmothers, pastors, and childhood friends.

Future appearances

Oswald & Danny were selected to race in The Amazing Race: All-Stars.

Alex Boylan went on to create and host the first season of the WGN America online reality show Around the World for Free, in which he journeyed around the world with no money, relying on the generosity and hospitality of locals. Blake Mycoskie appeared as a guest shark during the twelfth season of Shark Tank.

Results
The following teams are listed with their placements in each leg. Placements are listed in finishing order. 
A  placement with a dagger indicates that the team was eliminated. 
An  placement with a double-dagger indicates that the team was the last to arrive at a pit stop in a non-elimination leg. 
A  indicates that the team won the Fast Forward. 

Notes

Race summary

Leg 1 (United States → Brazil)

Episode 1: "The World Is Waiting: Go!" (March 11, 2002)
Prize: A vacation to Hawaii  (awarded to Tara & Wil)
Eliminated: Deidre & Hillary
Locations
Pahrump, Nevada (Pahrump Valley) (Starting Line)
 Las Vegas → Rio de Janeiro, Brazil
Rio de Janeiro (Corcovado – Christ the Redeemer )
 Rio de Janeiro → Paquetá Island
Paquetá Island (Fat Maria)
Paquetá Island (Lido Hotel – Ilha Tours)
 Paquetá Island → Rio de Janeiro
 Rio de Janeiro (Sugarloaf Mountain)
Rio de Janeiro (Sugarloaf Mountain  Ipanema Beach) 
 Rio de Janeiro (Urca Beach → Guanabara Bay – Tocorimé ) 
Episode summary
From a dry lake bed in Pahrump, Nevada, teams had to drive themselves to McCarran International Airport in Las Vegas and then fly to Rio de Janeiro, Brazil. Teams had to book one of two American Airlines flights; only seven teams were able to take the first flight, while the remaining four teams were on the second flight, which left 2:15 hours later. Once there, teams had to climb to the top of Corcovado Mountain, where they found their next clue at the base of the Christ the Redeemer statue.
Teams had to travel to Paquetá Island, where they had to find a big tree known as "Fat Maria" and follow the local custom of kissing the tree for good luck in order to receive their next clue. Teams made their way to the Lido Hotel, where they had to sign up for one of four boats returning to the mainland the next morning. Teams spent the night on the island and departed the next morning.
 This season's first Detour was a choice between Mountain or Beach. In Mountain, teams had to rappel  down the face of Sugarloaf Mountain in order to receive their next clue. In Beach, teams had to take the gondola back down and go to Ipanema Beach to find Heloísa Pinheiro, the woman who inspired the song "The Girl from Ipanema", who gave them their next clue.
Teams had to check in at the pit stop aboard the Tocorimé, a yacht in the middle of Guanabara Bay.

Leg 2 (Brazil)

Episode 2: "Help Me, I'm American!" (March 13, 2002)
Eliminated: Hope & Norm
Locations
Rio de Janeiro (Guanabara Bay – Tocorimé ) 
Rio de Janeiro (Barra da Tijuca – Acadêmicos da Barra da Tijuca )
Rio de Janeiro (Copacabana Beach) 
Rio de Janeiro (Pedra Bonita ) 
Rio de Janeiro (São Conrado Beach) 
 Rio de Janeiro → Foz do Iguaçu
Iguaçu National Park (Iguaçu Falls – Macuco Safari Dock) 
Iguaçu National Park (Trilha das Bananeiras – Jungle Camp) 
Episode summary
At the start of this leg, teams returned to Urca Beach, and from there, they traveled by taxi to Acadêmicos da Barra da Tijuca. In their clue, teams had also received a red feather, which they then had to match to one of the dancers' headdresses in the club. Once they found the correct dancer, she gave teams their next clue.
 This leg's Fast Forward required teams to travel to Copacabana Beach and play volleyball against a local team. While the participating team was allowed to use their hands, the local team could only use their feet. The first team to score ten points would win the Fast Forward award. Shola & Doyin won the Fast Forward.
 This leg's Detour was a choice between Freak Out or Seek Out. In Freak Out, teams had to hang glide in tandem with a local instructor, gliding from the mountain to the beach below. Once both teammates landed on the beach, they were given their next clue. In Seek Out, teams had to travel down to the same beach and use a metal detector to find their next clue buried somewhere along a  stretch of sand.
After completing the Detour, teams were instructed to travel by bus to Foz do Iguaçu.
 In this season's first Roadblock, one team member had to ride a speedboat and use a map to direct the driver to Iguaçu Falls. There, they had to spot the route marker at the top of a rock formation in order to retrieve their next clue and head back to the dock. 
After completing the Roadblock, teams had to check in at the pit stop at a nearby jungle camp.

Leg 3 (Brazil → South Africa)

Episode 3: "My Alarm Clock Didn't Go Off!" (March 20, 2002)
Eliminated: Peggy & Claire
Locations
Iguaçu National Park (Trilha das Bananeiras – Jungle Camp) 
 Foz do Iguaçu → Cape Town, South Africa
 Cape Town → Robben Island
Robben Island (Maximum Security Prison)
 Robben Island → Cape Town
Kalk Bay (Kalk Bay Harbour) 
 Kalk Bay → Cape Town
Cape Town (Langa – Paradise Hair Salon) 
Stellenbosch (Lanzerac Manor) 
Episode summary
At the beginning of this leg, teams were instructed to fly to Cape Town, South Africa. Once in Cape Town, teams had to take a ferry to Robben Island and find Nelson Mandela's prison cell in order to retrieve their next clue.
 This leg's Detour was a choice between Dance or Deliver. In Dance, teams had to perform a gumboot dance with a local troupe until they made R25 (roughly $1.40) in tips, which they could exchange for their next clue. In Deliver, teams had to carry fish from a boat and transfer it to a set of scales until they had transferred  in order to receive their next clue.
After completing the Detour, teams had to travel by train to the Langa Township of Cape Town.
 In this leg's Roadblock, one team member had to search through Langa Township to buy a box of Epsom salts and a "Smiley" (a roasted sheep's head). They then had to deliver the Smiley as an offering to Ndaba Sangoma, who made a bitter potion out of the salts which the team member had to drink in order to receive the next clue.
Teams had to check in at the pit stop: Lanzerac Manor, a winery in Stellenbosch.
Additional notes
Peggy & Claire flew from Brazil to South Africa via New York City and London, and arrived in Cape Town a full day after all of the other teams. Instead of completing all of the tasks in the leg, they received instructions at Robben Island to go directly to the pit stop for elimination.

Leg 4 (South Africa → Namibia)

Episode 4: "This Game Is About Minutes" (March 27, 2002)
Eliminated: Shola & Doyin
Locations
Stellenbosch (Lanzerac Manor) 
Cape Town (Cape Aviation Business Center – Ryan Blake Air)
 Cape Town → Walvis Bay, Namibia
Swakopmund (Swakopmund Lighthouse)
Swakopmund (Swakopmund Hotel) 
Erongo Region (Dorob National Park – Matterhorn Sand Dune)   
Usakos (Spitzkoppe – General Dealer)
Usakos (Spitzkoppe – Woodcarver's Market) 
Khomas Region (Amani Lodge) 
Episode summary
At the start of this leg, teams were provided a map and told to travel to the Cape Aviation Business Center and find Ryan Blake Air, where they signed up one of two charter flights leaving the next morning to Walvis Bay, Namibia. Once in Namibia, teams had to make their way to the Swakopmund Lighthouse, where they had to spot a row of marked vehicles on a parking lot. They found their next clue on the windshield. For safety reasons, they were accompanied by a local driver who took over driving at dusk.
 This leg's Fast Forward required one team to look "where the railway tracks used to run". Once the team realized that the Swakopmund Hotel had been a railway station, they then had to search the hotel grounds for the Fast Forward award in the center of the pool. Oswald & Danny won the Fast Forward.
 This leg's Detour was a choice between Slide or Stride. In Stride, teams would have had to walk down the opposite side of the dune along a marked path to their next clue. All teams chose to slide down the sand dune, except for Shola & Doyin, who did not reach the sand dune until after the hours of operation had closed for the day.
After completing the Detour, teams had to find the General Dealer convenience store in Spitzkoppe and ask for the "postcard of the day", which was their next clue.
 In this leg's Roadblock, one team member had to buy five wooden animal carvings (lion, rhinoceros, buffalo, leopard, and elephant) using their own money and for the lowest price possible, and then bring the carvings to a bushman, who exchanged them for a large carved wooden giraffe with their next clue attached.
After completing the Roadblock, teams had to take the giraffe carving to the pit stop at the Amani Lodge.
Additional notes
Shola & Doyin got their vehicle stuck in the sand and it took some time to extricate it. This caused them to arrive at the Detour after the hours of operation had closed for the day. As all of the other teams had completed the Detour and were able to check in at the pit stop, Shola & Doyin went directly to the pit stop without performing the Detour and were eliminated.

Leg 5 (Namibia → Thailand)

Episode 5: "Welcome To The World Of Being Human" (April 3, 2002)
Eliminated: Cyndi & Russell
Locations
Khomas Region (Amani Lodge) 
 Windhoek → Bangkok, Thailand
 &  Bangkok (Erawan Shrine)
Bangkok (Bird Market  Chinatown) 
 Bangkok → Ratchaburi
Photharam (Wat Khao Chong Phran) 
Amphawa (Ban Plai Pong Pang) 
Episode summary
At the beginning of this leg, teams were instructed to travel to Windhoek and then fly to Bangkok, Thailand. Once in Bangkok, teams had to travel by bus and train to Erawan Shrine, where they found the next clue near the temple dancers.
 This leg's Detour was a choice between Confusion Now or Confusion Later. In Confusion Now, teams had to search for a specific water taxi dock and find the correct taxi that could take them to a bird market. Once there, they had to buy and release a cage full of sparrows for good karma. In Confusion Later, teams had to travel by taxi to Chinatown, where they had to purchase a "car" to burn and send to their ancestors at the Lee Ti Biew shrine. Teams had to figure out that the car they needed was one of the many small paper cars sold at multiple booths near the shrine.
After completing the Detour, teams then had to travel by bus to Ratchaburi.
 In this leg's Roadblock, one team member had to don a protective mask, gloves, and boots and venture into a nearby cave filled with millions of bats in order to retrieve their next clue.
Teams had to check in at the pit stop: Ban Plai Pong Pang in Amphawa.

Leg 6 (Thailand)

Episode 6: "I'm Gonna Take His Girl" (April 10, 2002)
Locations
Amphawa (Ban Plai Pong Pang) 
Bangkok (Pak Khlong Talad Flower Market)
 Bangkok → Chiang Mai
Ban Muang Kut (Old Bridge) 
Ban Muang Kut (Mae Taeng River Camp)
Chiang Mai Province (Mae Ping Village) 
Chiang Dao District (Karen Village) 
Episode summary
At the start of this leg, teams had to travel back to Bangkok and search for a flower vendor around Pak Khlong Talad using given street names in order to find their next clue. Teams were then instructed to travel by train to Chiang Mai.
 This leg's Detour was a choice between Boat or Beast. In Boat, teams had to travel  down the river using a bamboo raft with long wooden poles. In Beast, teams would have had to ride the same  on an elephant down the path next to the river. All teams chose to travel by boat, and found their next clue on a marked car at the Mae Taeng River Camp. 
 In this leg's Roadblock, one team member had to wash a series of ceremonial chalk decorations off of an elephant using only water, soap, and a sponge in order to receive their next clue.
Teams had to check in at the pit stop: Karen Village in the Chiang Dao District.
Additional notes
This was a non-elimination leg.

Leg 7 (Thailand → Hong Kong)

Episode 7: "I'm Gonna Throw Up On Phil's Shoes" (April 17, 2002)
Eliminated: Mary & Peach
Locations
Chiang Dao District (Karen Village) 
Chiang Mai (Seven Spires)
 Chiang Mai → Hong Kong
Hong Kong (Wan Chai – Central Plaza)
Hong Kong (Kowloon – Wong Tai Sin Temple) 
 Hong Kong (Yau Tsim Mong District)
Hong Kong (Fong Ma Po Village – Lam Tsuen Wishing Trees  Yau Tsim Mong District – Sang Sang Medicine Hall) 
Hong Kong (Kwai Tsing District – Hongkong International Terminals) 
 Hong Kong (Victoria Harbour – Duk Ling Chinese Junk) 
Episode summary
At the beginning of this leg, teams had to make their way to the Seven Spires in Chiang Mai in order to find their next clue, which instructed them to fly to Hong Kong and then go "to the top floor of the tallest building in Hong Kong", which they had to figure out was the Central Plaza. Once at the top of the Central Plaza, teams used binoculars to search the area for a "green and white star", which they had to figure out was the Star Ferry terminal at Wan Chai Pier.
 This leg's Fast Forward required one team to travel to Wong Tai Sin Temple in Kowloon, where they found a fortune teller, who gave one team member a face reading and the other a palm reading before giving them the Fast Forward award. Gary & Dave won the Fast Forward.
 This leg's Detour was a choice between Wishing Tree or Herbal Tea. In Wishing Tree, teams had to take a taxi  to Lam Tsuen and find a wishing tree. Once there, both team members had to write a wish on a scroll and throw it into the tree's branches in order to receive the next clue. In Herbal Tea, teams had to walk to a nearby herbalist shop on Reclamation Street and ask for a bitter herbal tea, which both team members had to each drink in order to receive the next clue.
 In this leg's Roadblock, one team member had to use a crane to lift one  shipping container off of a truck and lower it to the ground. The same team member had to then return the crane to its original position. Once this was done, the other team member was allowed to get the next clue from the side of the shipping container. 
Teams had to check in at the pit stop aboard the Duk Ling, a Chinese junk floating in Victoria Harbour.
Additional notes
The boarding place of the sampan to the pit stop was wrongly identified as Aberdeen instead of Central, both on the CBS website and by Phil's narration. Yet, Alex, Wil, and Blake all directed their taxi drivers to Lung Wui Road instead. Wil even spelled out the road name to the taxi radio dispatcher for directions.
Mary & Peach fell so far behind all of the other teams that instead of completing all of the tasks in this leg, they received instructions to go directly to the pit stop for elimination.

Leg 8 (Hong Kong → Australia)

Episode 8: "I'm Not a Miner! No, You're An Idiot!" (April 24, 2002)
Prize: A seven-night Caribbean cruise (awarded to Oswald & Danny)
Locations
Hong Kong (Victoria Harbour – Duk Ling Chinese Junk) 
 Hong Kong (Central and Western District – Lung Wui Road)
 Hong Kong (Repulse Bay – Repulse Bay Beach)
Hong Kong (Repulse Bay – Kwun Yam Shrine (Tien-Hou Statue))
Hong Kong (Stanley – Murray House) 
 Hong Kong → Sydney, Australia
Sydney (City Centre – Sydney Opera House)
Sydney (City Centre – Martin Place, Hyde Park & Circular Quay) 
Sydney (City Centre – Museum of Contemporary Art) 
Episode summary
At the start of this leg, teams had to take a sampan back ashore, travel by bus to Repulse Bay, and then find the statue of Tien-Hou at Kwun Yam Shrine in order to find their next clue. From there, teams had to travel to the Murray House in order to find their next clue.
 This leg's Detour was a choice between Dragon or Lion. In Dragon, teams had to row a 12-seat dragon boat through a marked  course in order to retrieve their next clue. In Lion, teams had to carry a ceremonial lion through a  course of narrow markets and steep stairs in order to retrieve their clue.
After completing the Detour, teams were instructed to fly to Sydney, Australia, and find their next clue at the Sydney Opera House.
 In this leg's Roadblock, one team member had to follow a series of clues written in Australian slang. Team members had to continue this task until they specifically received a clue instructing them to reunite with their partner.
Teams had to check in at the pit stop: the rooftop of the Museum of Contemporary Art in Sydney.
Additional notes
 In this leg's unclaimed Fast Forward, one team would have had to find the Po Lin Monastery and then climb 268 steps to the Tian Tan Buddha in order to claim the Fast Forward award.
Graham Keating, Sydney's town crier, served as the pit stop greeter for this leg.
This was a non-elimination leg.

Leg 9 (Australia)

Episode 8: "I'm Not a Miner! No, You're An Idiot!" (April 24, 2002)
Prize: A vacation to Cancún (awarded to Chris & Alex)
Eliminated: Gary & Dave
Locations
Sydney (City Centre – Museum of Contemporary Art) 
Sydney (Woolloomooloo – Harry's Cafe de Wheels) 
Sydney (BridgeClimb Sydney & Sydney Harbour Bridge)
 Sydney → Adelaide
Adelaide (Adelaide Airport – National Jet Systems Terminal)
 Adelaide → Coober Pedy
Coober Pedy (The Metal Tree)
Coober Pedy (Tom's Working Opal Mine  Coober Pedy Opal Fields Golf Club) 
Breakaways National Park (Lookout 2) 
Breakaways National Park (Aboriginal Camp) 
Episode summary
At the beginning of this leg, teams had to first sign up at BridgeClimb Sydney, and then climb to the top of the Sydney Harbour Bridge in order to obtain their next clue.
 This leg's Fast Forward required one team to go to Harry's Cafe, where each team member had to eat a meat pie. Chris & Alex won the Fast Forward.
Teams were instructed to fly to Coober Pedy in the Australian Outback. To get there, teams had to first fly to Adelaide and make their way to the National Jet Systems Terminal, where they signed up for one of three charter flights to Coober Pedy. Once in Coober Pedy, teams had to drive themselves to the Metal Tree sculpture in order to find their next clue.
 This leg's Detour was a choice between Cool Down or Heat Up. In Cool Down, teams had to find Opal Quest at Tom's Working Opal Mine, descend into the tunnels, and use traditional mining tools to search for an opal in order to receive their next clue. In Heat Up, teams had play three holes of golf on the driest golf course in the world in order to receive their next clue. However, the holes all crisscrossed each other, and teams had to play in the intense heat of up to  using only a map and one ball.
After completing the Detour, teams had to travel to Lookout 2 of Breakaways National Park and follow a series of flags into a valley in order to find their next clue.
 In this leg's Roadblock, one team member had to throw a boomerang from within a circle such that the boomerang would leave, return, and land within the circle in order to receive their next clue.
Teams had to check in at the pit stop: a nearby Aboriginal camp.
Additional notes
Legs 8 and 9 aired back-to-back as a special two-hour episode.

Leg 10 (Australia → New Zealand)

Episode 9: "Ready To Lose Our Lives" (May 1, 2002)
Prize: A vacation to Puerto Rico (awarded to Blake & Paige)
Locations
Breakaways National Park (Aboriginal Camp) 
Coober Pedy → Glendambo
 Glendambo → Adelaide
 Adelaide → Queenstown, New Zealand
Queenstown (Shotover River) 
Gibbston Valley (Wentworth Station)
Nevis River (Nevis Highwire Platform) 
Mount Somers (Canterbury Plains – Inverary Sheep Station)  
Episode summary
At the beginning of this leg, teams were instructed to fly to Queenstown, New Zealand. This required teams to drive back to Coober Pedy and load their vehicles onto a trailer called a road train that transported them to Glendambo. They then drove to a local airstrip and signed up one of two charter flights to Adelaide. From Adelaide, teams were able to book flights to Queenstown.
 This leg's Fast Forward required one team to make their way to Shotover River. There, they had to ride a jetboat and spot a Route Marker. Blake & Paige won the Fast Forward.
At Wentworth Station, teams found marked vehicles, and instructed their drivers to take them to the edge of a cliff. From there, two teams at a time could catch a gondola that took them across the gorge to the Nevis Highwire Platform.
 This leg's Detour was a choice between Quick Jump or Long Hike. In Quick Jump, teams had to take a tandem bungee jump  down to the clue at the bottom of the canyon. In Long Hike, teams would have had to hike down a long trail to the bottom of the canyon in order to reach the clue box. All teams chose to perform the bungee jump.
 In this leg's Roadblock, one team member had to enter a pen full of sheep and move the three black sheep from among the twenty-two white sheep to a second pen at the end of the corral. When they were finished, teams could then run to the nearby pit stop.
Additional notes
This was a non-elimination leg.

Leg 11 (New Zealand)

Episode 10: "It's Hammer Time" (May 8, 2002)
Prize: A vacation to Los Cabos (awarded to Tara & Wil)
Eliminated: Danny & Oswald
Locations
Mount Somers (Canterbury Plains – Inverary Sheep Station) 
 Picton → Wellington
Rotorua (Maori Arts & Crafts Institute)
Rotorua District (Mount Tarawera) 
Waitomo District (Waitomo Caves – The Lost World) 
Auckland (Woodhill – 4 Track Adventures) 
Auckland (Ardmore Airport – Warbirds Hangar) 
Episode summary
At the start of this leg, teams chose a campervan, which they used for the remainder of the leg. Teams then had to travel by ferry to Wellington and then make their way to the Maori Arts & Crafts Institute, where they found their next clue.
 This season's final Fast Forward required one team to perform a "scree run" down Mount Tarawera, a run down the loose rock walls directly into the mouth of the dormant volcano. Tara & Wil won the Fast Forward.
 This leg's Detour was a choice between Drop or Climb. In Drop, teams had to descend  into a cavern known as "The Lost World" and then walk a short distance in order to retrieve their next clue. In Climb, teams would have had to climb down a  ladder into the same cavern, but then walk a much longer distance in order to reach the next clue. All teams chose the  descent.
 In this leg's Roadblock, one team member had to ride an ATV through a challenging off-road course over difficult terrain and then collect the clue at the end of the course.
Teams had to check in at the pit stop: the Warbirds Hangar at the Ardmore Airport in Auckland.

Leg 12 (New Zealand → United States)

Episode 11: "Follow That Plane!" (May 15, 2002)
Prize: A vacation to London and Paris (awarded to Tara & Wil and Blake & Paige)
Locations
Auckland (Ardmore Airport – Warbirds Hangar) 
Auckland (One Tree Hill – Sir John Logan Campbell Monument)
 Auckland → Kahului, Hawaii
Paia (Old Maui High School)
Haiku-Pauwela (Pauwela Pineapple Field) 
 Maalaea (McGregor Point) → Molokini 
Mokulau (Huialoha Church) 
Episode summary
At the start of this leg, teams were directed to find the "Father of Auckland". They had to figure out that their next destination was the Monument of Sir John Logan Campbell at One Tree Hill, where they found their next clue. Teams were then instructed to fly to Maui, Hawaii. Once in Maui, teams had to drive to the ruins of an abandoned sugar mill in order to find their next clue.
 This season's final Detour was a choice between Bike or Walk. In Bike, teams would have had to search a large pineapple field on a pair of bicycles in order to find the only red plastic pineapple that held their clue inside. In Walk, teams searched the same field on foot in order to find one of four yellow plastic pineapples which also held their clue inside. All teams chose to walk.
After the Detour, teams headed to McGregor Point where they had to navigate the arrows to the water's edge and choose a motorboat to take them to Molokini along a course of red and yellow buoys in order to find their next clue.
 In this leg's Roadblock, one team member had to snorkel near the sunken island and find and open one of three yellow cases chained underwater in order to retrieve the clue sealed inside.
After completing the Roadblock, teams had to check in at the next pit stop: the Huialoha Church in Mokulau.
Additional notes
This was a non-elimination leg.

Leg 13 (United States)

Episode 11: "Follow That Plane!" (May 15, 2002)
Winners: Chris & Alex
Second Place: Tara & Wil
Third Place: Blake & Paige
Locations
Mokulau (Huialoha Church) 
Hana (Queen Kaʻahumanu's Birthplace)
 Kahului → Anchorage, Alaska
Anchorage (Rust's Flying Service)
 Anchorage → Trapper Creek
Big Lake (Homesteader's Hardware Store)
Matanuska-Susitna Borough (Hurricane Gulch Bridge) 
 Anchorage  Fairbanks → Oakland, California
San Francisco (Atkinson-Esher House)
San Francisco (Municipal Pier)
Sausalito (East Fort Baker) 
Episode summary
At the start of this leg, teams had to drive themselves to a pier in Hana Bay and find Queen Kaʻahumanu's birthplace in order to find their next clue, which instructed them to fly to Anchorage, Alaska. Once in Anchorage, teams had to find Rust's Flying Service, where they had to instruct their pilots to fly them to Trapper Creek. Teams spent the night in igloos.
The next morning, teams had to put on snowshoes and hike through the woods to obtain their next clue, where one team member drove a Snowcat across a frozen lake. Teams had to go to Homesteader's Hardware Store, where they had to pick up a set of tools along with their next clue.
 In this season's final Roadblock, one team member had to use any of the tools they'd picked up to retrieve their clue which was frozen inside a large globe of ice.
Teams were then instructed to fly to San Francisco, California. Once in San Francisco, teams had to find Landmark #97 near the intersection of Broadway and Jones streets – the Atkinson-Esher House – in order to obtain their next clue.
Teams were then instructed to travel on foot to Municipal Pier for their final clue, which directed them to travel to  East Fort Baker and then run to the finish line.
Additional notes
Though Tara & Wil arrived at the final destination first, Chris & Alex arrived immediately after them, and overtook Tara & Wil in a footrace to the finish line. It was the closest finish in the history of The Amazing Race.
Legs 12 and 13 aired back-to-back as a special two-hour episode.

Reception

Critical response
The Amazing Race 2 received positive reviews with the final footrace to the finish often regarded as one of the show's best moments. Linda Holmes of Television Without Pity wrote that "the teams weren't as compelling as personalities this go-round" compared to the previous season but it was "still just a really good show." In 2016, this season was ranked 11th out of the first 27 seasons by the Rob Has a Podcast Amazing Race correspondents. Kareem Gantt of Screen Rant wrote that this season was "where the show finally gained its sea legs. This season went bold with its Roadblocks, and it also contained a good amount of drama that kept fans on the edge of their seats all season long." In 2021, Jane Andrews of Gossip Cop ranked this season as the show's overall best season. In 2022, Jason Shomer of Collider ranked this season among the show's top seven seasons. In 2022, Rhenn Taguiam of Game Rant ranked this season as the ninth-best season.

References

External links
Official website

 02
2002 American television seasons
Television shows filmed in Nevada
Television shows filmed in Brazil
Television shows filmed in New York City
Television shows filmed in England
Television shows filmed in Germany
Television shows filmed in South Africa
Television shows filmed in Namibia
Television shows filmed in Thailand
Television shows filmed in Hong Kong
Television shows filmed in Singapore
Television shows filmed in Australia
Television shows filmed in New Zealand
Television shows filmed in Hawaii
Television shows filmed in Alaska
Television shows filmed in California